Oeme is a genus of beetles in the family Cerambycidae, containing the following species:

Species 
The genus consists of the following species:

 Oeme costata LeConte, 1873
 Oeme rigida (Say, 1826)

References 

Xystrocerini